Appalachian cuisine is a style of cuisine found in the Appalachia cultural region of the Eastern United States. The cuisine of the region has been defined by the intersection of food within culture, traditions, and history; as well as relating to the regional practices of production and consumption of food.

About 

The cuisine of Appalachia focuses on seasonal local ingredients and practices like pickling, foraging, canning and food preserving. It is a subset of Southern cuisine, and is specifically different because of the cold winters and the mountainous landscape.

Promoters of Appalachian foodways include Eliot Wigginton, Ronni Lundy, John Fleer, Lora Smith, Kendra Bailey Morris, Travis Milton, Ashleigh Shanti, and Sean Brock.

History 
Appalachian cuisine is an amalgam of the diverse foodways, specifically among the British, German and Italian immigrant population, the Cherokee people, and African-Americans, as well as their descendants in the Appalachia region. British immigrants to Appalachia brought buttermilk, biscuits, dumplings, and moonshine. Chefs from the region have noted other European-originated foods like Italian sausage, and borscht. The Cherokee in Appalachia have contributed to the cuisine with dishes and ingredients such as boiled chestnut bread, fried creasy greens, ramps, pokeweed, corn, and fiddlehead greens. Poet Frank X Walker has coined the term "Affrilachian" to signify the importance of the African-American presence in Appalachia, including in the cuisine. The African-Americans in Appalachia have contributed to the regional food history with ingredients such as kale, collard greens, peanut beans, foods infused with bourbon (baked goods, and vegetables), spoonbread, and the use of molasses and sorghum as a meat glaze.

Staples of Appalachian cuisine that are common in other regional cuisines of the south and in soul food include peanut brittle, sweet potato pie, pork chops, biscuits and gravy, fried chicken, chicken and dumplings, collard greens, cracklings, and ham hocks. Appalachia has a wide variety of wild game, with venison, rabbit, raccoon, and squirrel particularly common, thus helping to compensate for distance from major cities and transportation networks (this was particularly true in the 19th-century). Many aspects of the diet came from economic necessity. Subsistence farming was the backbone of the Appalachian economy throughout much of the 19th century, and is still a practice in the present-day in some areas through farming revitalization efforts. 

Traditionally most Appalachia homes used a fireplace and a dutch oven for cooking, which cooks hotter than a wood-burning stove. However some households preferred using a wood-burning stove. Sunday dinners are a tradition for many in the region.

List of foods

Breads

Beans

Pickles

Meat dishes

Other dishes

Desserts

Pies and cobblers

Cakes

Candy

Other desserts

List of beverages
corn liquor
Cheerwine soft drink
Jack Daniel's whiskey
moonshine
Mountain Dew
sweet milk (whole milk)
sweet tea

List of common ingredients

Meats

Fruits

Vegetables

Other common ingredients 
 honey
 eggs
 buttermilk
 bay leaf oil

See also
Appalachian music
Appalachian studies
Appalachian Studies Association 
Foxfire (magazine), a student-run magazine about Appalachian culture

References

Further reading

External links 
 

Appalachian culture

American cuisine by ethnic group